The Concertino for Horn and Orchestra in E minor, J188 (Op. 45), was composed in 1806 for the Karlsruhe player Dautrevaux, and revised for the Munich virtuoso Rauch in 1815 (completed on 31 August) by Carl Maria von Weber . It is an extremely taxing work, whether played  on the natural horn for which it was written, or on the modern valve horn. The soloist is accompanied by a small orchestra.  It requires, among other feats, that the player produce what is in effect a four-note chord using the interplay between humming and the sound from the instrument, a technique known as multiphonics.

The work is widely recorded and performed, appearing in the repertoire of well-known horn players including Hermann Baumann, Barry Tuckwell and David Pyatt.

It was originally written for the natural horn, and the authentic performance movement still sees it played on this instrument; for example, by Anthony Halstead with the Hanover Band.

Instrumentation
The Concertino is scored for a small orchestra of 1 flute, 2 clarinets, 2 bassoons, 2 horns, 2 trumpets, timpani and strings.

Structure
The form is loosely constructed and can be described as (slow) introduction, (andante) theme, variations, recitative, polonaise .

References

Further reading
 Blandford, W. F. H. 1926. "Some Observations on 'Horn Chords: An Acoustical Problem'". The Musical Times 67, no. 996 (1 February): 128–31.
 Kirby, Percival R. 1925. "Horn Chords: An Acoustical Problem". The Musical Times 66, no. 991 (1 September): 811–13.
 Pethő, Csilla. 2000. "'Style Hongrois': Hungarian Elements in the Works of Haydn, Beethoven, Weber and Schubert". Studia Musicologica Academiae Scientiarum Hungaricae 41, fasc. 1–3:199–284.

External links

Compositions by Carl Maria von Weber
Weber
1815 compositions
Weber